The 1981–82 Duke Blue Devils men's basketball team represented Duke University. The team's head coach was Mike Krzyzewski and the team finished the season with an overall record of 10–17 and did not qualify for the NCAA tournament.

Schedule

References

Duke
Duke Blue Devils men's basketball seasons
1981 in sports in North Carolina
1982 in sports in North Carolina